CPEP may refer to:

 Center for Preservation Education and Planning, a collaboration with the United States' National Trust for Historic Preservation
 Colombo Harbour Expansion Project, a port expansion project in Sri Lanka
 Comité-directeur de la Caisse de Pension des Employés Privés, the largest private-sector pension fund of Luxembourg
 Committee on Printed and Electronic Publications, a committee at the International Union of Pure and Applied Chemistry
 Communist Party of East Pakistan, a political party in Pakistan
 Contemporary Physics Education Project at the University of Michigan
 Comprehensive Psychiatric Emergency Program, a standard of Psychiatric Emergency rooms
 Computer Professional Education Program, an education program at the Australian Computer Society